Microcephalic osteodysplastic primordial dwarfism type II (MOPD II) is  a form of primordial dwarfism associated with brain and skeletal abnormalities. It was characterized in 1982.
 
MOPD II is listed as a rare disease by the Office of Rare Diseases (ORD) of the National Institutes of Health (NIH). This indicates that MOPD (or a subtype of MOPD) affects less than 200,000 people in the US population.

It is associated with the protein pericentrin (PCNT).

Notable persons with MOPD II
 Lucia Zarate, sideshow entertainer
 Bridgette Jordan, smallest living woman until her death in 2019

See also
Primordial dwarfism

References

External links 

Growth disorders